Leo von Jena, also called Leo Ferdinand von Jena (born July 8, 1876, in Biebrich am Rhein - died April 7, 1957, in Celle) was a German military officer who became a SS General during World War II and commander of the Waffen SS in Berlin. Von Jena joined the German National People's Party and the SA-Sturmabteilung in 1921. He join the Nazi Party in 1936. On November 9, 1936, he joined the SS-Schutzstaffel  and Heinrich Himmler personally accepted him as an honorary SS-Sturmbannfuhrer, where he rose through the SS ranks.  On March 30, 1941, he was promoted to SS Brigadefuhrer of the Waffen SS. On January 30, 1944, he was promoted to SS Obergruppenfuhrer of the Allgemeine SS and Lieutenant General (Generalleutnant) in the Waffen-SS.

World War I

Von Jena was the eleventh child of the Prussian officer and later general of the infantry Eduard von Jena (1834-1911) and his first wife Elisabeth Auguste Karoline Helene, née Freiin von Dalwigk (1840-1880).

In May 1896 he joined the cadet corps (Kadettenkorps) with the Life Grenadier Regiment "König Friedrich Wilhelm III." (1st Brandenburg) No. 8 (Leib-Grenadier-Regiment König Friedrich Wilhelm III.) with the rank of Fahnenjunker. On November 18, 1897, he was promoted to second lieutenant and assigned to the war school in Danzig. In May 1902 he transferred to the Holstein Field Artillery Regiment No. 24 in Güstrow. Between April 30, 1903, and 1911 he served in various military units. On February 18, 1908, Jena was promoted to Oberleutnant. In 1911 he became adjutant of the Landwehr district of Frankfurt (Oder) (Oder).  In September 1912 he became an aid and adviser to Prince Friedrich Leopold of Prussia. On October 18, 1912, he was promoted to Hauptmann (captain). In August 1913 von Jena was appointed personal adjutant to Prince Friedrich Karl of Prussia.

At the beginning of World War I in August 1914, he joined the 2nd Cavalry Division in Belgium and France. On 21 October 1914 he married his then fiancée Josefine Margarethe Schumacher. In December 1914 he became a company commander and battalion commander in the 5th Guards Regiment in Masuria, East Prussia. In the spring of 1915, von Jena was deployed back to France and suffered a knee injury during the Second Battle of the Marne. After recovery, he was deployed to the reserve battalion of the 5th Guards Regiment in Spandau, where he was appointed deputy adjutant of the 4th Guards Infantry Brigade in the fall of 1915. Soon he transferred to the Landwehr division of the Guards Corps. In November 1916 von Jena was promoted to commander of the 1st Battalion of the 4th Foot Guards Regiment and was assigned to the staff for the 1st Foot Guards Regiment in October 1917. Towards the end of the war, von Jena was commander of the Reserve Infantry Regiment No. 932.

Weimar Republic
Von Jena viewed himself as a victim of the November criminals, those that lost in the war due to an antisemitic conspiracy theory, given for the loss of the war. On December 16, 1918, he founded the National Association of German Officers with other officers loyal to the monarchy, like Alfred Krauss. On  January 12, 1919, von Jena joined one of the approximately 200 Volunteer Freikorps in Germany. In Berlin he became leader of the Volunteer Detachment Jena in the Freikorps von Oven. In 1919 von Jena was accepted as a captain in the provisional Reichswehr army and was promoted to major in October 1919, in the staff of the Reichswehr Infantry Regiment 6. On December 31, 1920, von Jena was released from the Reichswehr at his own request. On January 1, 1921, he was employed by the Reichswehr leadership as leader of the clean up command of the Reichswehr Infantry Regiment 6. In 1921 he joined Alfred Hugenberg's German National People's Party and became a leader in its military arm, the Stahlhelmbund. In the Stahlhelmbund he met the Prussian Lieutenant General Paul Hausser. In the Stahlhelmbund he became the liaison officer of the Bund to the German ex-Kaiser Wilhelm II, German Emperor and was on friendly terms with him. He stayed several times with Wilhelm in exile at Doorn in the Netherlands.

In 1921, von Jena joined the "ORSCH" (Weimar paramilitary Organization) headed by Georg Escherich part of the free corps. In ORSCH he became the military leader in Osthavelland in Brandenburg. In October 1921 he became a political officer at the National Association of German Officers (NVDO).

In 1924 von Jena became the managing director of the NVDO, which he led until its ended in 1934, when it was incorporated into the Reich Association of German Officers. In 1928 he also joined the association Kaiserdank e. V. (powerful contribution), which helped support Emperor Wilhelm II in exile. The Kaiserdank contributions were given to  Wilhelm on his 70th birthday. In 1924 he was fined 50 Reichsmarks by the Berlin district court for assault and insult.

In 1931 von Jena appeared as a speaker at the National Family Association, a propaganda event of the Bismarck Society in Berlin. In 1931 he became a member of the National Socialist Factory Cell Organization, but not a member of the Nazi Party yet. National Socialist Factory Cell Organization later became the German Reich Factory Cell Organization part of the Nazi Party in 1931.

National Socialism

In 1934 von Jena joined Wilhelm Reinhard's Kyffhäuserbund for war veterans in Berlin. The veterans group became aligned with Adolf Hitler's Sturmabteilung (SA).  Thus von Jena joined the Reichsbetriebszellenabteilung (Spandau Comradeship of Life Grenadiers No. 8) of the Nazi Party.

On February 1, 1934, he was elected to the federal leadership of the National Socialist Reichskriegerbund (NSRKB), a Nazi Veteran group and took over the personnel department of the Federal Leader's staff. Also on February 1, 1934, he joined the SA Reserve II, and was put in charge of member support for the staff of the Supreme State Leader, Adolf Hitler. In 1936 Paul Hausser who had joined the SS-Schutzstaffel persuaded von Jena to switch his membership from the SA to the SS (SS no. 277,326). On November 9, 1936, von Jena was accepted into the SS, at the rank of SS-Sturmbannführer by Reichsfuhrer SS Heinrich Himmler.  As Sturmbannführer he became leader of the staff of the SS main office.

While he joined the SS at his friend's urging, he still had strong ties and feelings to the House of Hohenzollern monarchy and the German Emperor, Wilhelm II.  SS leaders criticized him for his old views and not holding to a strong National Socialism.  Two days after being accepted into the SS, the staff chancellery information center of the SS security service reported to the Reichsfuhrer SS after examining "the political background" of Jena:

"Major a. D. Jena was still strongly nationalist after the takeover. (...) Jena is considered an outspoken monarchist and was the liaison between the Stahlhelm leadership and the ex-Kaiser. In this capacity, he was in Doorn for a long time. Because of this fact, von Jena cannot be called politically reliable. (...)” 

His work was good and on January 30, 1937, von Jena was promoted to SS-Obersturmbannführer and a Leader of the Reichsführer-SS Staff under Heinrich Himmler.  On April 20, 1937, he was promoted to SS-Standartenfuhrer. On November 9, 1937, promoted to SS-Oberfuhrer.

On November 15, 1937, von Jena applied for admission to the Nazi Party and was admitted retroactive to May 1, 1937 (membership number 4,359,167). 
In 1938 he became a substitute member in the German Reichstag.

World War II

In September 1939 Jena was transferred to the SS Totenkopf Unit, where became a leader in the 5th Totenkopfstandarte for Brandenburg Euthanasia Centre, he departed the centre before the killing began in February 1940. On December 1, 1939, Jena was transferred to the emerging Waffen-SS, when he set up the 8th SS Totenkopfstandarte in Kraków. He also became leader of police reinforcements, in occupied Poland. The police reinforcements were a special police task force for "gang and anti-partisan use".

On May 1, 1940, von Jena was appointed "SS-Oberführer for the Reserve" of the Waffen-SS. On July 11, 1940, he was transferred to the Command Office of the Waffen-SS. There, as "Group Leader II (Organization)", he headed a department in the "Management and Organization Office Group" of Office I, part of the SS Führungshauptamt.

On March 30, 1941, he was appointed Brigadeführer of the Allgemeine SS and received the right from Himmler to wear the "uniform and rank insignia of a major general of the Waffen SS". With Himmler's permission, von Jena was now outwardly wearing the same rank in the Waffen SS as in the Allgemeine SS and which he had not yet received in the Waffen SS. But within the SS leadership office, which was responsible for the command of the Waffen SS, his position was not without controversy. A letter from SS Personnel Manager Maximilian von Herff to Karl Wolff (November 23, 1942) stated:

Around Hans Jüttner there is a circle that needs to be monitored because it can become dangerous. This is the liaison of Gruppenfuhrer Petri, Brigadefuhrer Jena and Hansen. They are far removed from SS-like thinking and willing. They only want to be officers of the Guard, the other things are just a side issue for them! (...)

On April 1, 1941, von Jena was appointed location commander (Standortkommandanten) of the Waffen-SS in Berlin, but on February 10, 1942, he wrote to Himmler asking for his dismissal from this post, citing health problems:

My state of health has deteriorated so much in recent times that I am afraid that I will no longer be able to fill the post of SS site commander for Berlin in any case, as the Führer may have to demand. (...) I therefore ask you, Reichsfuhrer, to arrange for me to be relieved of my current position. (...) Should I be able to serve the Fuehrer in any other position within the Waffen-SS, I will of course remain available to you at any time for any other use you may have. (...).redcap70.net SS Leo von Jena

On March 1, 1943, von Jena was then replaced as Berlin site commander of the Waffen-SS and no longer used, but remained a member of the SS and was promoted to SS brigade leader of the reserve on July 1, 1944. Himmler had granted him the right to wear in the Waffen-SS uniform and the rank insignia of a major general of the Waffen-SS.

But on November 17, 1943, von Jena asked in writing for "dismissal from active service in the Waffen-SS with the statutory pension as of April 30, 1944".  With the polite phrases customary at the time, this letter to Heinrich Himmler ended with the words:

(...) With inner satisfaction I will always remember the time when I was allowed to serve the Führer and Greater Germany in the Waffen-SS in this most violent war of all times. (...) Of course, I, Reichsfuhrer, remain at your disposal whenever and wherever I may be needed. My life belongs to the Führer and the fatherland!

Von Jena was discharged from the Waffen-SS on December 18, 1943, effective January 31, 1944, having been appointed SS-Gruppenführer of the Allgemeine SS the day before.  For the Waffen-SS, the last regular SS seniority list noted that he was entitled to wear the uniform of SS-Obergruppenfuhrer and Lieutenant-General of the Waffen-SS.

A few days before the end of the war, von Jena was taken prisoner by the British Armed Forces and on May 2, 1945, was take to Island Farm Special Camp 11 near Bridgend, South Wales.

After his release from prison in October 1947, Jena lived in Celle. Between 1949 and 1950 he was close to the extremist Socialist Reich Party (SRP), which was banned in 1952, and openly supported it with numerous donations and guest appearances as a speaker. When von Jena, contrary to his own expectations, was not elected to the board, he withdrew from all political activity.

Von Jena joined HIAG for a short time then joined the  "Bund Deutscher Officere", a traditional association of former members of the Reichswehr and Wehrmacht, which he departed in 1956 and was not active in veterans groups again. He died on April 7, 1957, as a result of an illness.

Awards

    Knight's Cross of the Griffin Order [12]
    Princely Reuss Cross of Honor III. class with crown [12]
    Iron Cross (1914) 2nd and 1st class
    Knight's Cross of the Royal House Order of Hohenzollern with Swords
    Friedrich-August-Kreuz 2nd and 1st class
    Mecklenburg Military Merit Cross 1st Class
    SS Civil Badge (No. 192,576)
    Yule candlesticks of the RFSS (December 1936)
    Ring of Honor RFSS
    Honorary Sword of the Reichsfuhrer SS
    Hungarian World War II Commemorative Medal
    Honor's Corner of the Ancient Fighters
    War Merit Cross (1939) 2nd and 1st class with swords

See also 

Register of SS leaders in general's rank

References

1876 births
1957 deaths
SS-Obergruppenführer
German Army personnel of World War I
German people of World War II
SS and Police Leaders
Holocaust perpetrators
Members of the Reichstag of Nazi Germany
German prisoners of war in World War II held by the United Kingdom